This is a list of members of the Tasmanian Legislative Council between 1957 and 1963. Terms of the Legislative Council did not coincide with Legislative Assembly elections, and members served six year terms, with a number of members facing election each year.

Elections

Members

Notes
  In November 1958, Elliot Lillico, the member for Meander, resigned. Charles Best won the resulting by-election on 6 December 1958.
  On 7 December 1958, George Flowers, the member for Westmorland, died. Oliver Gregory won the resulting by-election on 14 February 1959.
  On 21 April 1959, Geoffrey Green, the member for Monmouth, died. Louis Bisdee won the resulting by-election on 4 July 1959.
  On 25 April 1960, Neil Campbell, the member for Tamar, died. Liberal candidate Daniel Hitchcock won the resulting by-election on 9 July 1960.
  In November 1961, John Orchard, the member for Cornwall, resigned. Geoffrey Foot won the resulting by-election on 10 December 1961.

Sources
 
 Parliament of Tasmania (2006). The Parliament of Tasmania from 1856

Members of Tasmanian parliaments by term
20th-century Australian politicians